Shamakhi is a city in Azerbaijan and the administrative centre of the Shamakhi District. The city's estimated population  was 31,704. It is famous for its traditional dancers, the Shamakhi Dancers, and also for perhaps giving its name to the Soumak rugs.

Eleven major earthquakes have rocked Shamakhi but through multiple reconstructions, it maintained its role as the economic and administrative capital of Shirvan and one of the key towns on the Silk Road. The only building to have survived eight of the eleven earthquakes is the landmark Juma Mosque of Shamakhi, built in the 8th century.

History

Shamakhi was in antiquity part of successive Persian empires and was first mentioned as Kamachia by the ancient Greco-Roman Egyptian geographer Claudius Ptolemaeus in the 1st to 2nd century AD. Shamakhi was an important town during the Middle Ages and served as a capital of the Shirvanshah realm from the 8th to 15th centuries.

Shamakhi maintained economic and cultural relations with India and China in the 12th century, and the excavation of pottery containers prove that Shamakhi also had relations with the Central Asian cities at around the same time. Copper coins found in Shamakhi during archaeological excavations, porcelain containers produced in China, caravanserais serving international trade, prove the role of ancient Shamakhi in the Silk Road.

The Catholic friar, missionary and explorer William of Rubruck passed through it on his return journey from the Mongol Great Khan's court. In 1476 Venetian diplomat Giosafat Barbaro, while describing the city, stated: "This [Sammachi] is a good city; it has from four to five thousand houses, it produces silk, cotton as well as other things according to its tradition.".

In 1500–1501, it was taken by the Safavid dynasty. Following the conquest of the area by the first Safavid ruler Ismail I, he allowed the descendants of Farrukh Yassar to rule Shamakhi and the rest of Shirvan under Safavid suzerainty. This lasted until 1538, when his son and successor, king Tahmasp I (r. 1524–1576), turned the territory into a full Safavid province and appointed its first Safavid governor. From then on, Shamakhi functioned as the capital of the Shirvan province. In 1562 Englishman Anthony Jenkinson described the city in the following terms: "This city is five days' walk on camels from the sea, now it has fallen a lot; it is predominantly populated by Armenians..."

According to Carmelite monks who visited the city in 1607, its population was made up of Persians and Armenians. Armenians were actively engaged in trade. In addition to ordinary taxes, the Armenian people paid tribute to other religions. Adam Olearius, who visited Shamakhi in 1637, wrote: "Its inhabitants are in part Armenians and Georgians, who have their particular language; they would not understand each other if they did not use Turkish, which is common to all and very familiar, not only in Shirvan, but also everywhere in Persia". The Ottoman traveller Evliya Çelebi visited the town in 1647 and described it as having  In the 1670s, the Spanish traveler Pedro Cobro Sebastian wrote that the inhabitants of Shamakhi were Persians, Armenians, and Georgians. According to John Bell, an English tourist, Turkish was the common language of the people of 1715, but the city's elites spoke Persian and there were many Georgians and Armenians in the city. The locals were mainly engaged in winemaking, animal husbandry and carpet weaving. In 1721, the Lezgins of the Safavid provinces of Shirvan and Dagestan, aided by the (rest of the) Sunni inhabitants of the area, sacked the city. They massacred thousands of its Shia inhabitants, apart from looting the city and robbing the property of its Christian inhabitants and foreign nationals, the latter which were mostly the city's many Russian merchants.

The Russian forces first entered Shirvan in 1723, as they invaded the Safavid Iranian territories in the North Caucasus and Transcaucasia during the Russo-Persian War (1722–1723), using the attack on their subjects in Shamakhi shortly before by the rebellious Lezgins as one of the pretexts. They however soon retired from the city, leaving it to Ottomans who possessed it in 1723–35, until Nader Shahs rise. The new Shamakhi was at different times a residence of the Shirvan Khanate, ruled by semi-independent khans, but it was finally abandoned, and the old town rebuilt. In the mid-1700s, the population of Shamakhi was about 60,000, most of whom were Armenians. At this time it was one of the best and most populous cities of Persia, before it was destroyed by an earthquake. The Shirvan Khanate was finally annexed by Russia in 1805 during the Russo-Persian War (1804–1813) and Qajar Iran was forced to irrevocably cede the sovereignty over the town to Russia, under the Treaty of Gulistan of 1813.

The British Penny Cyclopaedia stated in 1833 that "The bulk of the population of Shirvan consists of the Tahtar, or, to speak more correctly, Turkish race, with some admixture of Arabs and Persians. . . . Besides the Mohammedans, who form the mass of the population, there are many Armenians, some Jews, and a few Gipsies. According to the official returns of 1831, the number of males belonging to the Mohammedan population was 62,934; Armenians, 6,375; Jews, 332; total males 69,641. The prevalent language of Shirvan is what is there called Toorkee or Turkish, which is also used in Azerbijan". The same source also states that according to the official returns of 1832, the city of Shamakhi was inhabited by only 2,233 families, as a result of devastation from the sack of the city "in the most barbarous manner by the highlanders of Daghestan" in 1717. The Encyclopædia Britannica stated that in 1873 the city had 25,087 inhabitants, "of which 18,680 were Tartars and Shachsevans, 5,177 were Armenians, and 1,230 Russians". Silk production continued to be the main output, with 130 silk-winding establishments, owned mostly by Armenians, although the industry had considerably declined since 1864.

Shamakhi was the capital of the Shemakha uezd of the Shemakha Governorate of the Russian Empire until the devastating earthquake of 1859, when the capital of the province was transferred to Baku. The importance of the city declined sharply afterwards. According to the Brockhaus and Efron Encyclopedic Dictionary (vol. 77, p. 460, published in 1903), Shamakhi had 20,008 inhabitants (10,450 males and 9,558 females), of which 3% were Russians, 18% were Armenians, and 79% "Azerbaijani Tatars" (later known as Azerbaijanis). With regard to religion, 79% of the population was Muslim, of which 22% was Sunni and the rest Shia; the remaining 21% was Armenian Apostolic and Eastern Orthodox.

Weaving and rug making in Shamakhi 

Historically, Shamakhi was famous for its carpets of which decoration using the buta motif dominate as with other Shirvan carpets. Shirvan carpets are on display at some of the world's famous museums. Example of these are Shirvan (13th century) kept in Istanbul's Turkish and Islamic museum, Shirvan (15th century), kept in the East Region of the Berlin Art Museum, and Shamakhi (17th century) carpets kept in the Pennsylvania Museum of America.

Other artistic products include copper craft, pottery, tailoring, jewellery, woodworking, sculpture, and blacksmithery (blacksmiths were very popular in Alsahab). also developed in Shamakhi.

Geography

Seismicity
The city is located in the most seismic area of the Caucasus and was hit by powerful earthquakes in 1191 and 1859, which was so destructive that the capital of Shirvan was transferred to Baku twice. In 1872, the earthquake triggered emigration to Baku, where oil production had started in industrial proportions.

The 1667 earthquake is considered to have been the worst with a death toll of 80,000, with one-third of the city collapsed, according to the Persian merchants' reports. The last catastrophic earthquake was recorded in 1902, which destroyed the 10th-century Juma Mosque. Shamakhi is near the boundary of three plates.

Rivers 
In the south of Shamakhi flows to Zongalavay, and in the east Pirsaatchay. The city is surrounded by Binasli, Gushhan from the north, Pirdiraki, and Maiden Tower-Georgia from north-west and Meysari Mountains from the west. These mountains can be considered as the city's natural defense fortifications. There are many springs that provide urban population and people of surrounding villages with drinking water because of located at the slopes of the Caucasus Mountains.

Climate

Demographics

Ethnic groups
From the 16th century up until the 18th century, Armenians in Shamakhi formed the majority of the population. According to the 1917 publication of Kavkazskiy kalendar, Shamakhi—then known as Shemakha—had a population of 27,732 in 1916, including 14,811 men and 12,941 women, 27,259 of whom were the permanent population and 493 were temporary residents. Its ethnoreligous composition was as follows:

The majority of the population is Azerbaijani, while Russians, Lezgins and Tats constitute other minorities. They speak the Azerbaijani language, Russian language, Lezgian language and Tat language respectively.

Religion

The Juma Mosque of Shamakhi is the biggest religious building in the city. Through its history the mosque has been demolished or destroyed few times, but each time it has been rebuilt, most recently in 2009. It is the oldest mosque in the territory of Azerbaijan, and was built in 743–744. It is second in age in the South Caucasus after Derbent Juma mosque (built in 734). The mosque was registered by the Ministry of Culture and Tourism of the Republic of Azerbaijan as a historical and cultural monument of the country.

The mosque was restored several times in the Middle Ages Century during the Shamakhi earthquake in 1856 and 1902 was destroyed.  First reconstructed was done by Gasim Hajibababayov and later by Iosif Ploško. The last restoration work at the mosque was carried out in 2010–2013.

Economy
After the Decree "On measures to accelerate socio-economic development in the Republic of Azerbaijan", signed by Ilham Aliyev on 24 November 2003 and the "State Program on Socio-Economic Development of the Regions of the Republic of Azerbaijan" approved by the head of state, began to increase living standards in Shamakhi along with other regions.

Thus, at Shamakhi carpet shop where were installed 40 pieces of machine tools, which belongs to "Star" LTD, weave carpets such as "Guba-Shirvan", "Nakhchivan", "Garabagh" and "Tabriz". In 2005, at the Shamakhi TV Production Plant built by "Star" LTD, "Star" branded 37, 54, 72, 74 "LCD", "Plasma", "CV" and digital "Receivers" are produced based on spare parts of Toshiba "VCD"."Star" LTD has invested $10 million in the construction of the AzSamand mini-car production plant.

The building of the Historical-Ethnographic Museum named S.Shirvani was renovated and the bust of 12 great figures from the Shamakhi region was laid in the yard of the museum.

Culture

In the 19th century the town became famous due Shamakhi dancers, the principal dancers of the entertainment groups, similarly to tawaifs. The city is home to Shirvan Domes, a 15th-century mausoleum and graveyard located at the foot of Gulistan Fortress.

Music and media
One can trace the music scene in Shamakhi back to ancient times and to the villages of Baku, generally revered as the fountainhead of mugham in Azerbaijan.

Education

Shamakhi Humanitarian College
Şamaxı Humanitar Kolleci

International relations

Twin towns and sister cities
Shamakhi is twinned with the following cities:

Notable residents

The city's notable residents include: philosopher Seyid Yahya Bakuvi, poets Seyid Azim Shirvani, Khaqani and Mirza Alakbar Sabir, mugham singers Alim Qasimov, Yaver Kelenterli and Farghana Qasimova, actors Aghasadyg Garaybeyli and Abbas Mirza Sharifzadeh, architect Gasim bey Hajibababeyov, Armenian playwright and novelist Alexander Shirvanzade and others.

Gallery

See also
 Lankaran
 Qabala
 Ganja, Azerbaijan
 Shamakhi Astrophysical Observatory
 AzSamand
 Armenians in Shamakhi
 Shamakhi Fortress

Notes

References

Sources

Further reading

External links
Shamakhi Facebook official page
Shamakhi music (02.03.2014)

Populated places in Shamakhi District